Iglesia de San Francisco ("San Francisco church") is a church in Caracas, Venezuela. Dedicated to Francis of Assisi, it was built in 1593 under the design of Antonio Ruiz Ullán as an annex of the Convent of San Francisco (now the Palacio de las Academias). The church is notable as being the situ where Simón Bolívar received the title "El Libertador" (1813). His funeral occurred here in 1842.

References

Roman Catholic churches in Venezuela
Roman Catholic churches in Caracas
Roman Catholic churches completed in 1593
16th-century Roman Catholic church buildings in Venezuela
Tourist attractions in Caracas